The Association Guillaume Budé, named after the 16th century humanist Guillaume Budé, is a French cultural and learned society dedicated to the promotion of humanities. The current president of the society is the hellenist Jacques Jouanna.

The society was founded in 1917 by the philologists Maurice Croiset, Paul Mazon, Louis Bodin and Alfred Ernout. Its initial goal was to publish critical editions of Greek and Latin classics, competing with Germany which was then leading the field. The result was the Collection Budé, first published in 1920. The society soon founded its own publishing house Les Belles Lettres, and went beyond the classical world, becoming involved in the studies of Byzantine and medieval worlds. A bulletin has been published by the society since 1923. Besides publishing, the society organizes conferences, symposia and cultural tours.

External links
Official web site

Philology
Learned societies of France